The women's 53 kilograms weightlifting event at the 2004 Summer Olympics in Athens, Greece took place at the Nikaia Olympic Weightlifting Hall on 15 August.

Total score was the sum of the lifter's best result in each of the snatch and the clean and jerk, with three lifts allowed for each lift.  In case of a tie, the lighter lifter won; if still tied, the lifter who took the fewest attempts to achieve the total score won.  Lifters without a valid snatch score did not perform the clean and jerk.

Schedule 
All times are Eastern European Summer Time (UTC+03:00)

Records

Results 

 Sanamacha Chanu of India originally finished fourth, but she was disqualified after she tested positive for furosemide.

References

External links
Official Olympic Report 
IWF Results – Athens 2004 Olympic Coverage 

Women 053
Women's events at the 2004 Summer Olympics
Olymp